János Szabó (3 March 1945 – 15 October 2017) was a Hungarian middle-distance runner. He competed in the men's 3000 metres steeplechase at the 1968 Summer Olympics.

References

External links
 
 

1945 births
2017 deaths
Athletes (track and field) at the 1968 Summer Olympics
Hungarian male middle-distance runners
Hungarian male steeplechase runners
Olympic athletes of Hungary
Athletes from Budapest
20th-century Hungarian people